Zagarye is a rural locality (a village) in Gorodetskoye Rural Settlement, Kichmengsko-Gorodetsky District, Vologda Oblast, Russia. The population was 59 as of 2002.

Geography 
Zagarye is located 15 km southwest of Kichmengsky Gorodok (the district's administrative centre) by road. Konishchevo is the nearest rural locality.

References 

Rural localities in Kichmengsko-Gorodetsky District